The 1984 Volta a Catalunya was the 64th edition of the Volta a Catalunya cycle race and was held from 5 September to 12 September 1984. The race started in Platja d'Aro and finished at Girona. The race was won by Sean Kelly of the Skil team.

General classification

References

1984
Volta
1984 in Spanish road cycling
September 1984 sports events in Europe